Saeed Jaffrey OBE (Punjabi: ਸਈਦ ਜਾਫ਼ਰੀ,) 1929 - 2015) was a British-Indian actor who worked in numerous British and Indian movies. His film credits include The Man Who Would Be King (1975), Shatranj Ke Khiladi (The Chess Players) (1977), Gandhi (1982). His brief filmography is given below.

Filmography

References

External links

British filmographies
Indian filmographies
Male actor filmographies